The domra (Cyrillic: до́мра) is a long-necked Belarusian, Russian, and Ukrainian folk string instrument of the lute family with a round body and three or four metal strings.

History
The first known mention of domra is in Admonitions of Metropolitan Daniel (1530). This musical instrument gained great popularity in the 16th–17th centuries, replacing gusli. There are numerous mentions of domra in historic documents of this period. In addition, medieval Russian illuminated manuscripts of the Psalter contain images of musicians with necked plucked-string instruments, and some of those miniatures are clearly captioned «depiction of domras». Judging by those images, late medieval Russian domras can be divided into two types: lute-shaped, which had five to six strings, a large body and а pegbox angled back, and tanbur-shaped, which had three to four strings, a small body and a straight pegbox.

After the pious Tsar Alexis of Russia issued an edict ordering the persecution of Russian folk musicians and destruction of their instruments (1648), domra gradually came into disuse and was replaced by balalaika, which was much easier to make and play.

In 1896, a student of Vasily Vasilievich Andreyev found a broken instrument in a stable in rural Russia. It was thought that this instrument may have been an example of a domra, although at that time no illustrations or examples of the traditional domra were known to exist (the traditional domra was only known through numerous mentions in folklore, though examples existed of the dombra, a related Turkic instrument). A three-stringed version of this instrument was later redesigned in 1896, patented, and introduced into the orchestra of Russian folk instruments.

The three-stringed domra uses a tuning in 4ths.

Later, a four-stringed version was developed employing violin tuning by Moscow instrument maker, Liubimov, in 1905.

Today, it is the three-stringed domra that is used almost exclusively in Russia. It is played with a plectrum, and is often used to play the lead melody in Russian balalaika ensembles. The four-stringed domra is primarily widespread in Ukraine.

The modern domra is typically played with a plectrum, although some performers strum the instrument like a balalaika, but this is uncommon.

Orchestral instruments

The basic domra is tuned as follows:
 Three strings: EAD tuning. 
 Four strings: GDAE tuning (like the mandolin or the violin)

Instruments are made in various sizes including piccolo, prima, alto, tenor, bass, and contrabass.

 Piccolo: b1 e2 a2
 Prima: e1 a1 d2
 Mezzo-Soprano: b e1 a1
 Alto: e a d1
 Tenor: B e a
 Bass: E A d
 Contrabass (minor): 1E 1A D
 Contrabass (major): 1A D G

Performers
Tamara Volskaya is considered to be one of the leading contemporary performers on the 4 string domra. She is a Merited Artist of Russia, a Laureate of the USSR competition, and a professor at the Mussorgsky Ural State Conservatory in Yekaterinburg, Russia. She now lives in New York City. 
Aleksandr Tsygankov is considered to be one of the leading contemporary performers, teachers, and composers of the 3 string domra. He lives in Moscow.

See also

Balalaika

References

Bibliography

External links

The Andreyev State Russian Orchestra

Russian musical instruments
Necked bowl lutes
Russian folk music
Russian inventions
Ukrainian musical instruments
Ukrainian folk music